Chéticamp Flowage  is a reservoir of Victoria County, in north-eastern Nova Scotia, Canada.

Winds can be strong over this flowage, making canoeing difficult. Despite this, fishing is a popular activity here.

See also
List of lakes in Nova Scotia

References
 National Resources Canada

Lakes of Nova Scotia